Kromme Zandweg was a football ground in Rotterdam, the Netherlands. It was the home of the professional football club Feyenoord – then known as Feijenoord – from 1917 until 1937, when the club moved to the Feijenoord Stadium.

References

Feyenoord
Defunct football venues in the Netherlands
Sports venues completed in 1917